Gustavo Cascardo de Assis (born 24 March 1997), known as Gustavo Cascardo, is a Brazilian footballer who plays as a right back.

Career
Born in Mogi das Cruzes, São Paulo, Cascardo joined Portuguesa's youth setup in 2006, aged nine. On 13 January 2015, after appearing in the year's Copa São Paulo de Futebol Júnior, he was promoted to the main squad.

After being included in the 28-man list for the year's Campeonato Paulista, Cascardo made his professional debut on 8 April, coming on as a second-half substitute in a 0–3 away loss against São Paulo.

On 12 September 2015 Cascardo rescinded his contract, and moved to Atlético Paranaense. After returning to the youth setup, he was promoted to the main squad ahead of the 2017 season, and made his Série A debut on 25 June of that year by starting in a 4–1 home routing of Vitória.

In January 2019, after being rarely used, Cascardo moved abroad and joined Primeira Liga side Vitória F.C. on loan for six months. He also spent the 2019–20 campaign on loan at Slovakia's FK Senica.

On 25 September 2020, free agent Cascardo signed a one-year contract with Botafogo still in the top tier.

References

External links

1997 births
Living people
People from Mogi das Cruzes
Brazilian footballers
Association football defenders
Campeonato Brasileiro Série A players
Campeonato Brasileiro Série C players
Associação Portuguesa de Desportos players
Club Athletico Paranaense players
Botafogo de Futebol e Regatas players
Associação Desportiva Confiança players
Primeira Liga players
Vitória F.C. players
Slovak Super Liga players
FK Senica players
Brazilian expatriate footballers
Brazilian expatriate sportspeople in Portugal
Brazilian expatriate sportspeople in Slovakia
Expatriate footballers in Portugal
Expatriate footballers in Slovakia
Footballers from São Paulo (state)